Lesnoy is an urban locality (a work settlement) in Pushkinsky District of Moscow Oblast, Russia, located  northeast from Moscow on the road to Yaroslavl and Arkhangelsk. Population: 

Lesnoy history dates back to 1934, when Sovnarkom decided to build a transmitting radio center in Pushkinsky District. A settlement that grew around the radio center was officially named Lesnoy on April 1, 1954.

References

External links
Unofficial website of Lesnoy 

Urban-type settlements in Moscow Oblast